Events from the year 2017 in Jordan

Incumbents
 Monarch – Abdullah II 
 Prime Minister – Hani Al-Mulki

Events

Deaths

8 January – Klaib Al-Fawwaz, diplomat and politician, Minister of State for Cabinet Affairs (b. 1950).

8 February – Georges El-Murr, Archbishop of the Melkite Greek Catholic Archeparchy of Petra and Philadelphia in Amman (b. 1930).

25 July – Rula Quawas, feminist academic (b. 1960).

References

 
Years of the 21st century in Jordan
Jordan
Jordan
2010s in Jordan